Eigen Wereld is Opgezwolle's third album, released on the Dutch TopNotch label.

Track listing
All tracks feature both Rico & Sticks, except for "Elektrostress" (performed by Rico), "Ukkie" (performed by Rico), "Gerrit" (performed by Sticks), "Vroeger / Nu" (performed by Sticks featuring James) and "De Jug" (instrumental track).

"Hoedenplank"
"Werk aan de Winkel"
"Balans" (featuring Josje & Shyrock)
"Gekkenhuis" (featuring Jawat!)
"Nagemaakt"
"Eigen Wereld"
"Elektrostress"
"Passievrucht / Bosmuis" (featuring Duvel)
"Made in NL"
"NL Door"
"Gebleven"
"Ut is Wat Het is" (featuring Raymzter)
"Volle Kracht" (featuring Winne)
"Gerrit"
"Ukkie"
"Vroeger / Nu" (featuring James)
"Regendans"
"Ogen Open"
"Tunnelvisie"
"De Jug"
"Park" (featuring Bert Vrielink)

Credits
Peter Blom - Producer
J. Uiterwijk - Writer
R. McDougal - Writer
Reuben Hamburger - Bass guitar on "Balans"
Onno Wieten - Accordion on "Gekkenhuis"
Dries Bijlsma - Guitar on "Gekkenhuis", "NL Door" & "Park"
Reinder van Raalte - Musical saw on "Gekkenhuis"
Maurits Boreel - Violin on "Eigen Wereld"
Fred Zomer - Soprano saxophone on "De Jug"

2006 albums